Panagiotis Vasilopoulos, commonly known as Panos Vasilopoulos (alternate spellings: Panayiotis, Vassilopoulos) (Greek: Παναγιώτης "Πάνος" Βασιλόπουλος; born February 8, 1984) is a Greek former professional basketball player who currently serves as an assistant coach for Peristeri of the Greek Basket League and the Basketball Champions League, under head coach Vassilis Spanoulis. He is 2.05 m (6'8 ") tall. He played at both the small forward and power forward positions.

Early years
Vasilopoulos was born in Maroussi, Athens, and grew up at his hometown of Ano Samiko Elis.
He started to play basketball with the youth clubs of Ifitos Pyrgou. Later, he transferred to the youth clubs of Iraklis Pyrgou.

Professional career

PAOK
Vasilopoulos began his pro career in 2001, with PAOK of the Greek League. He played with PAOK for four seasons, from 2001 to 2005. In the 2005 off season, he transferred from PAOK to joined Olympiacos Piraeus.

Olympiacos
Vasilopoulos was brought to Olympiacos in 2005, by George Garbolas, on a two-year contract. Garbolas believed in his abilities, and that he could help the team to win championships. On May 20, 2008, he extended his contract with Olympiacos for another 4 years, at a salary of €6 million euros net income. With Olympiacos, he won the EuroLeague and Greek League championships in 2012.

Injury plagued seasons
On February 8, 2012, Vasilopoulos suffered a season-ending leg injury, just after he had returned from a previous back surgery. He was released by Olympiacos. Vasilopoulos then signed with the Spanish League club Valladolid, in September 2013. He was released by Valladolid in December 2013, after suffering a knee injury.

Comeback from injuries
After being released by Valladolid in December 2013, Vasilopoulos then signed with the amateur level Greek club Ermis Piraeus, in April 2014. He then returned to play professionally again, in the Greek top-tier level GBL, with Nea Kifissia. Vasilopoulos then moved to the Greek club Koroivos, for the 2015–16 season. 

Vasilopoulos next moved to the Greek club Kolossos Rodou, for the 2016–17 season. On July 26, 2017, Vasilopoulos signed with the Greek club Aris Thessaloniki, and played with them in the FIBA Champions League's 2017–18 season.

AEK Athens
On January 19, 2018, Vasilopoulos moved to AEK Athens, for the rest of the season. With AEK, he won the 2018 Final of the Greek Cup, as well as the FIBA Champions League championship.

Peristeri
On July 27, 2018, Vasilopoulos signed a 2-year contract with Peristeri of the Greek Basket League, where he eventually became the team captain. He averaged 7.1 points, 3.4 rebounds, 1.9 assists and 1.4 steals per game during the 2019-2020 season. On August 17, 2020, he re-signed with Peristeri. On August 20, 2021, he officially parted ways with the club after three seasons and retired from professional basketball. 

In December 2021, Vasilopoulos joined the coaching staff of Milan Tomić in Peristeri. In July 2022, he renewed his contract and stayed on as an assistant to his former national squad and Olympiacos teammate Vassilis Spanoulis.

National team career

Greek junior national team
Vasilopoulos played with Greek national junior teams at the 2004 FIBA Europe Under-20 Championship, and also at the 2005 FIBA Under-21 World Cup. With the Greek junior national teams, he also won the bronze medal at both the 2002 FIBA Europe Under-18 Championship, and at the 2003 FIBA Under-19 World Cup.

Greek senior national team
Vasilopoulos was a member of the senior men's Greek national basketball team that won the gold medal at the EuroBasket 2005, and the silver medal at the 2006 FIBA World Championship. He also competed with Greece at the EuroBasket 2007, the 2008 Summer Olympics, the 2019 FIBA European World Cup qualification, and the 2019 FIBA World Cup.

Player profile
Early in his career, Vasilopoulos was compared to the long-time Olympiacos player Georgios Sigalas. He is a player that can play either the small forward or power forward positions, in both offense and defense. He can play in the post on offense, and can also pass well, and has 3 point range on his jump shot. In his playing prime, he was an excellent athlete, and was considered to be one of the best and most tenacious defensive players in Europe.

Career statistics

Domestic Leagues

Regular season

| 2015–16
| style="text-align:left;"| Koroivos
| align=center | GBL
| 26 || 23.1 || .423 || .365 || .688 || 5.4 || 2.6 || 1.2 || .4 || 6.0
|-
| 2016–17
| style="text-align:left;"| Kolossos Rodou
| align=center | GBL
| 26 || 27.1 || .391 || .329 || .698 || 5.9 || 2.0 || 1.1 || .5 || 7.7
|-
| 2017–18
| style="text-align:left;"| Aris
| align=center | GBL
| 12 || 28.0 || .400 || .356 || .733 || 5.8 || 1.8 || 1.2 || .7 || 7.8
|-
| 2017–18
| style="text-align:left;"| A.E.K.
| align=center | GBL
| 11 || 16.1 || .333 || .250 || .857 || 2.8 || .9 || .5 || .4 || 3.6
|-
| 2018–19
| style="text-align:left;"| Peristeri
| align=center | GBL
| 26 || 29.1 || .429 || .382 || .804 || 4.8 || 2.5 || 1.0 || .6 || 9.4
|}

FIBA Champions League

|-
| style="text-align:left;" | 2017–18
| style="text-align:left;" | Aris
| 11 || 27.4 || .469 || .520 || .643 || 5.4 || 2.5 || .7 || 1.0 || 8.9
|-
| style="text-align:left;background:#AFE6BA;" | 2017–18†
| style="text-align:left;" | A.E.K.
| 9 || 11.5 || .421 || .417 || .750 || 3.0 || .7 || .4 || .7 || 3.0
|}

References

External links
Euroleague.net Profile
FIBA Profile
FIBA Champions League Profile
Eurobasket.com Profile
Greek League Profile
Greek League Profile 
Spanish League Profile 
Draftexpress.com Profile
Hellenic Federation Profile 

1984 births
Living people
2006 FIBA World Championship players
2019 FIBA Basketball World Cup players
AEK B.C. players
Aris B.C. players
Basketball players at the 2008 Summer Olympics
CB Valladolid players
FIBA EuroBasket-winning players
Greek expatriate basketball people in Spain
Greek men's basketball players
Kolossos Rodou B.C. players
Koroivos B.C. players
Liga ACB players
Nea Kifissia B.C. players
Olympiacos B.C. players
Olympic basketball players of Greece
P.A.O.K. BC players
Peristeri B.C. coaches
Peristeri B.C. players
Power forwards (basketball)
Small forwards
People from Elis
Sportspeople from Western Greece